Survivor: Vanuatu — Islands of Fire, also known as Survivor: Vanuatu, is the ninth season of the American CBS competitive reality television series Survivor. The season was filmed from June 28, 2004, through August 5, 2004, and the season premiered on September 16, 2004. Filming took place in Vanuatu, a chain of volcanic islands in the South Pacific. Hosted by Jeff Probst, it consisted of the usual 39 days of gameplay, with 18 competitors for the second time in the series' history.

This was the second season to initially divide the tribes by gender following Survivor: The Amazon. Chris Daugherty was named the winner and Sole Survivor after defeating runner-up Twila Tanner by a jury vote of 5–2.

Contestants

The cast is composed of 18 new players, initially divided into two tribes by gender: the male tribe was named Lopevi, after one of Vanuatu's volcanic islands; while the female tribe was named Yasur, after Mount Yasur. It was the first season to feature an amputee (Chad Crittenden, who had lost a foot to cancer) and two openly LGBT+ women (motivational speaker Scout Cloud Lee and former Playboy model Ami Cusack). On Day 11, there was a tribal shuffle which ended up moving two people from each tribe over to the other tribe. On Day 20, the tribes were merged with ten contestants remaining; the tribe was named Alinta, a name proposed by Cloud Lee meaning "people of fire."

Future appearances
Ami Cusack and Eliza Orlins returned for Survivor: Micronesia as members of the Favorites tribe.

Outside of Survivor, John "J.P." Palyok competed on Season 2 of Fox Reality Channel's reality-game show Solitary. In 2006, Twila Tanner competed with Survivor: Pearl Islands castaway Jonny Fairplay on a Reality Star episode of Fear Factor. Orlins later competed on The Amazing Race 31 with fellow two-time Survivor contestant Corinne Kaplan.

Season summary
The eighteen players were brought into the game at a native gathering, with the natives dividing the group into men and women. The men were clearly favoured at the ceremony, creating animosity between them and the women. After the ceremony, the men were named the Lopevi tribe, and the women the Yasur tribe, and sent to find their camps in the dark. Lopevi lost the first challenge mainly due to Chris, but he created a majority alliance with older tribe members Sarge, Travis, Rory, and Chad, and worked to vote off the younger men. In Yasur, two factions began to emerge, one composed of Julie, Mia, Lisa, and Eliza and the other of Ami, Twila, Scout, and Leann. While both factions lobbied for Dolly's vote, her refusal to commit resulted in her elimination. Both tribes were sent to tribal council on Day 7 as a result of a twist. The older men continued to eliminate the younger ones, and Ami's faction, now in power, voted Mia off. The Yasur tribe continued their dominance over the tribal challenges by winning the next reward and immunity challenges, bringing the men's numbers down to six.

A tribal switch occurred on day 11, mixing the two tribes; Rory and Travis were sent to Yasur while Twila and Julie were sent to Lopevi. The first Yasur loss resulted in Travis being eliminated for trying to publicly ask Lopevi to throw the immunity challenge. However, concerned over Lisa's loyalty, Ami arranged for the tribe to eliminate her at the next Tribal Council. At Lopevi, Sarge, Chad, and Chris aligned with Twila and Julie, not trusting John K. as the last young man remaining. He was voted off and the five remaining Lopevi tribe members agreed to stick together after the merge.

On Day 19, with six women and four men remaining, the two tribes merged into Alinta. While Rory joined the Lopevi alliance, Julie and Twila broke their word and reformed the women's alliance. The men were quickly targeted over the next three tribal councils, leaving Chris as the sole male. By this time, Ami's core alliance consisted of her, Julie, and Leann, while Twila and Scout had formed a closer pairing and Eliza on the outside. Despite Chris losing immunity, Ami decided to spare him and vote Eliza out instead. However, Twila and Scout took the opportunity to align with Chris and Eliza, creating a new majority alliance and systematically voting out the others.

Chris won the last two immunity challenges, and ultimately took Twila with him into the final two. The jury saw Chris' ability to effectively stay in the game with the odds against him, from the first challenge to being the last man standing, and voted him the Sole Survivor in a vote of 5–2.

In the case of multiple tribes or castaways who win reward or immunity, they are listed in order of finish, or alphabetically where it was a team effort; where one castaway won and invited others, the invitees are in brackets.

Episodes

Voting history

Notes

Reception
The season has generally been negatively received, with the primary criticism being the repetition of the "battle of the sexes" theme, and how the theme arguably did not work as well in this season as it did in Survivor: The Amazon. Host Jeff Probst, ranking it as the 5th-worst season in 2010, admittedly felt that he "liked this season more than the audience did, and that has probably influenced why it has dropped since my last ranking." Tom Santilli of Examiner.com ranked it among the bottom 10 at #21, while Dalton Ross of Entertainment Weekly ranked it the seventh-worst season of the series, only better than San Juan del Sur, One World, Thailand, Fiji, Nicaragua and Island of the Idols, saying that although "the battle of the sexes worked well the first time around," he felt it wasn't as strong in this season. In 2020, it was ranked 31st out of 40 by Survivor fan site "The Purple Rock Podcast", saying that "the casting was below average on this season," and since "the gimmick/twist for this season was one the show had used before…the issue here is whether you like that narrative." Andrea Deiher of Zap2it ranked it as the 3rd-worst season, saying that "we can barely remember anyone from this season…this was just kind of a dud season." In 2015, a poll by Rob Has a Podcast ranked Vanuatu 17th out of 30 with Rob Cesternino ranking this season 19th. This was updated in 2021 during Cesternino's podcast, Survivor All-Time Top 40 Rankings, ranking 23rd out of 40. In 2020, Inside Survivor ranked this season 22nd out of 40 saying that while "there are a few casting duds on Vanuatu, and the early merge suffers from a predictable Pagonging against the men, there's still a lot to love in this season thanks to its characters, unexpected moments, and a fantastic endgame."

References

External links
 Official CBS Survivor Vanuatu Website

09
2004 American television seasons
2004 in Vanuatu
Television shows filmed in Vanuatu